Lot 44 is a township in Kings County, Prince Edward Island, Canada.  It is part of East Parish. Lot 44 was awarded to merchant Robert Campbell and William Fitzherbert in the 1767 land lottery while Fitzherbert was the Member of Parliament (MP) for Derby.

References

44
Geography of Kings County, Prince Edward Island